The 2014 NCAA Division I Indoor Track and Field Championships was the 50th NCAA Men's Division I Indoor Track and Field Championships and the 33rd NCAA Women's Division I Indoor Track and Field Championships, held at the Albuquerque Convention Center in Albuquerque, New Mexico near the campus of the host school, the University of New Mexico. In total, thirty-two different men's and women's indoor track and field events were contested from March 14 to March 15, 2014.

Results

Men's events

60 meters
Final results shown, not prelims

60 meters with hurdles
Final results shown, not prelims

200 meters
Final results shown, not prelims

400 meters
Final results shown, not prelims

800 meters
Final results shown, not prelims

Mile
Final results shown, not prelims

3000 meters
Final results shown, not prelims. Only top ten results shown

5000 meters
Final results shown, not prelims. Only top ten results shown

Distance Medley Relay
Leg 1 is 1200 meters, Leg 2 is 400 meters, Leg 3 is 800 meters, and Leg 4 is 1600 meters. Only top ten final results shown

Heptathlon
Final results shown, not prelims

Weight Throw
Final results shown, not prelims

Shot Put
Final results shown, not prelims

Long Jump
Final results shown, not prelims

Triple Jump
Final results shown, not prelims

Pole Vault
Final results shown, not prelims

High Jump
Final results shown, not prelims

Women's events

w60 meters
Final results shown, not prelims

w60 meters with hurdles
Final results shown, not prelims

w200 meters
Final results shown, not prelims

w400 meters
Final results shown, not prelims

w800 meters
Final results shown, not prelims

wMile
Final results shown, not prelims

w3000 meters
Final results shown, not prelims. Only top ten results shown

w5000 meters
Final results shown, not prelims. Only top ten results shown

wDistance Medley Relay
Leg 1 is 1200 meters, Leg 2 is 400 meters, Leg 3 is 800 meters, and Leg 4 is 1600 meters. Only top ten final results shown

Pentathlon
Final results shown, not prelims

wWeight Throw
Final results shown, not prelims

wShot Put
Final results shown, not prelims

wLong Jump
Final results shown, not prelims

wTriple Jump
Final results shown, not prelims

wPole Vault
Final results shown, not prelims

wHigh Jump
Final results shown, not prelims

See also
 NCAA Men's Division I Indoor Track and Field Championships 
 NCAA Women's Division I Indoor Track and Field Championships

References

NCAA Indoor Track and Field Championships
NCAA Division I Indoor Track and Field Championships
NCAA Division I Indoor Track and Field Championships
Sports in Albuquerque, New Mexico
Sports competitions in New Mexico
NCAA Division I Indoor Track and Field Championships
NCAA Division I Indoor Track and Field Championships
Events in Albuquerque, New Mexico